is a former table tennis player from Japan. From Hiroshima, she was in the city on 6 August 1945, when the first of two atomic bombs was dropped on Japan.

Table tennis career
From 1952 to 1955 she won five medals in doubles and team events in the World Table Tennis Championships.

The five World Championship medals  included two gold medals in the doubles with Tomie Nishimura at the 1952 World Table Tennis Championships and the team event also at the 1952 World Table Tennis Championships.

See also
 List of table tennis players
 List of World Table Tennis Championships medalists

References

Japanese female table tennis players
1928 births
Possibly living people